William Fairfield Whiting (July 20, 1864August 31, 1936) was United States Secretary of Commerce from August 22, 1928 to March 4, 1929, during the last months of the administration of Calvin Coolidge.

Early life and career 
Whiting was born on July 20, 1864, in Holyoke, Massachusetts. He was the son of Massachusetts politician and businessman William Whiting and his wife Anna Morgan (née Fairfield).  He attended Amherst College and graduated in the class of 1896 alongside future Secretary of State Robert Lansing.

When Whiting's father, who organized the Whiting Paper Company, became president of that business, William Fairfield Whiting became treasurer.  When his father died, Whiting became president of the Whiting Paper Company and his brother Samuel Raynor Whiting became treasurer.  He became a lifelong friend of future President Coolidge when Coolidge was mayor of Northampton, Massachusetts.  Later, Whiting and Frank Stearns were the first two "Coolidge Men" who advocated their friend as a serious presidential candidate.  At the 1920 Republican National Convention, Whiting voted for Coolidge for president on every ballot, the sole delegate to do so after Warren Harding had sewed up the votes to win the nomination.

Whiting was appointed as President Coolidge's Secretary of Commerce after the resignation of Herbert Hoover surprised the Washington establishment. The position was predicted to go to Hoover's preferred candidate, Dr. Julius Klein, the director of the Bureau of Foreign and Domestic Commerce and Klein did not get the position when Hoover became president.  Former Senator William Butler of Massachusetts turned down the post before Coolidge offered it to Whiting.  His appointment was confirmed by the United States Senate on December 11, 1928.

During his first press interview after his appointment, Whiting stated, "My policies will be Mr. Hoover's policies."  As secretary, he headed President Coolidge's delegation to the International Conference on Civil Aeronautics.

Personal life 
Whiting married the former Anne H. Chapin, daughter of Judge Edward Whitman Chapin, on October 19, 1892.  The couple had four children:  William Whiting, Edward Chapin Whiting, Fairfield Whiting and Ruth Whiting Fowler.  Like his father, Whiting gained a reputation for raising Jersey cattle and poultry.

He died of a long illness at his Holyoke home on August 31, 1936. He is interred in Forestdale Cemetery in Holyoke along with his parents.

References

External links
Political Graveyard

1864 births
1936 deaths
Amherst College alumni
Coolidge administration cabinet members
20th-century American politicians
Massachusetts Republicans
Politicians from Holyoke, Massachusetts
United States Secretaries of Commerce
Burials in Massachusetts